Petrus Maufer, also known as Pierre Maufer, Pietro Maufer, or Petrus Maufer de Maliferis, was a 15th-century French printer of incunables, who learned the trade together with Martin Morin when the family Lallemant from Rouen sent them to the Rhine region to learn about book printing. Instead of returning to Rouen with Morin, he travelled to Italy and became one of the earliest known printers in Padua, Verona, Venice and Modena.

Known publications

Padua
1474: Pietro d'Abano. Liber Compilationis Phisonomiae
1474: Mondino de Liuzzi. Anatomia
1474: Simon de la Porte: Clavis sanationis
Before 1475: Matheolus Perusinus. De memoria
1476: Albertus Magnus. De mineralibus. Corr: Nicolaus de Pigaciis
1476-1477: Ovid. Fabularum Breviatio
1477: Gentile da Foligno. Commentary on Avicenna.
1478: Giles of Rome. Expositio super libros Analyticorum posteriorum Aristotelis
1479: Justinianus. Digestum novum
1480: Muhammad ibn Zakariya al-Razi. Liber nonus ad Almansorem

Verona
1480: Flavius Josephus e.a. De Bello Judaico and De Antiquitate Judaeorum Contra Apionem

Venice
1482: Bartolus de Saxoferrato. Codex
1486: Avicenna. Canon medicinae

Modena
1491: Bartholomaeus Socinus. Repetitio legis Gallus ff. de liberis et posthumis
1492: Johannes Lichtenberger. Pronosticatione in vulgare
Johannes Baptista de Caccialupis. De debitoribus susceptis et fugitivis. De pactis. De Transactionibus

Further reading
Giovanni Mardersteig, translated by H. Schmoller (London, Nattali & Maurice, 1967). The remarkable story of a book published in Padua in 1477. Gentile da Foligno's commentary on Avicenna printed by Petrus Maufer.

Notes

Year of birth unknown
Year of death unknown
French printers
Businesspeople from Rouen
15th-century French businesspeople
Printers of incunabula